Adult Contemporary is a chart published by Billboard ranking the top-performing songs in the United States in the adult contemporary music (AC) market.  In 1970, 16 songs topped the chart, then published under the title Easy Listening, based on playlists submitted by easy listening radio stations and sales reports submitted by stores.

On the first chart of 1970, the number one position was held by "Raindrops Keep Fallin' on My Head" by B. J. Thomas, which was in its third week atop the Easy Listening chart, and also held the top spot on Billboards all-genres listing, the Hot 100.  It remained atop the Easy Listening chart for the first four weeks of the year before being replaced by "Without Love (There Is Nothing)" by Welsh singer Tom Jones.  Thomas and Jones returned to number one later in the year with "I Just Can't Help Believing" and "Daughter of Darkness" respectively, and were two of the four acts to achieve two Easy Listening number ones in 1970.  Elvis Presley reached the top spot with both "The Wonder of You" and "You Don't Have to Say You Love Me" and the Carpenters had number ones with both "(They Long to Be) Close to You" and "We've Only Just Begun".  The former song was the breakthrough hit for the Carpenters, also topping the Hot 100 and launching a period of international stardom for the brother-sister duo.  After spending six weeks in the top spot of the Easy Listening chart in the summer with "(They Long to Be) Close to You", the Carpenters spent a further seven weeks at number one in the fall with "We've Only Just Begun", the longest unbroken run of the year atop the chart.  The duo's total of 13 weeks spent at number one was the most by any act in 1970.

In April, the Beatles achieved their first and only number one on the Easy Listening chart with "Let It Be".  Although the British quartet had achieved huge success in the United States, spearheading the so-called British Invasion of the American market, few of their hits had crossed over to the Easy Listening market.  Within days of their topping the chart, Paul McCartney announced his departure from the group, instigating a split which was complete by the end of the year, bringing the career of the most successful and influential band of all time to an end.  "Let It Be" also topped the Hot 100, as did "Bridge over Troubled Water" by Simon & Garfunkel, and "Everything is Beautiful" by Ray Stevens.  The final Easy Listening number one of the year was "It's Impossible" by Perry Como, which held the top spot for the final four weeks of 1970.

Chart history

References

See also
1970 in music
List of artists who reached number one on the U.S. Adult Contemporary chart

1970
1970 record charts